Ischnodemus hesperius is a species of true bug in the family Blissidae. It is found in North America.

References

 Thomas J. Henry, Richard C. Froeschner. (1988). Catalog of the Heteroptera, True Bugs of Canada and the Continental United States. Brill Academic Publishers.

Further reading

 

Blissidae
Insects described in 1922